The C.G.E. Show was a Canadian television series which aired on CBC Television on September 8, 1952 to June 14, 1959. The C.G.E. Show (sponsored by Canadian General Electric) featured the Leslie Bell Singers, a choir of twenty-one young women, and the Howard Cable Orchestra.

External links
 Queen's University Directory of CBC Television Series (The C.G.E. Show archived listing link via archive.org)

1952 Canadian television series debuts
1959 Canadian television series endings
CBC Television original programming
1950s Canadian music television series
Black-and-white Canadian television shows
General Electric sponsorships